Plasmodium holaspi is a parasite of the genus Plasmodium subgenus Lacertamoeba. 

Like all Plasmodium species P. holaspi has both vertebrate and insect hosts. The vertebrate hosts for this parasite are reptiles.

Description 
The parasite was first described by Telford in 1986.

Geographical occurrence 
This species is found in Tanzania.

Clinical features and host pathology 
This parasite infects the flying lacertid Holaspis guentheri.

References 

holaspi